Kyzyl-Eshme is a village in Osh Region of Kyrgyzstan. It is part of the Chong-Alay District. Its population was 1,532 in 2021.

The village Daroot-Korgon is 3 miles (5 km) to the west.

References

External links 
Satellite map at Maplandia.com

Populated places in Osh Region